Rough Riders is the third album by Lakeside. Released in 1979 on the SOLAR Records label, it was produced by Dick Griffey, Lakeside, and Leon Sylvers III.

Track listing
"Rough Rider" (Stephen Shockley) - 4:45   	
"All In My Mind" (Otis Stokes, Stephen Shockley, Tiemeyer McCain) - 4:42 	
"If You Like Our Music (Get Up and Move)" (Otis Stokes, Stephen Shockley) - 4:33 	
"I Can't Get You Out of My Head" (Norman Beavers) - 5:36 	
"Pull My Strings" (Fred Lewis) - 6:54 	
"I'll Never Leave You" (Bryan Evans, Tiemeyer McCain) - 6:15 	
"From 9:00 Until" (Otis Stokes) - 6:04

Personnel
 Backing vocals, bass, clavinet, guitar, lead vocals, piano (acoustic), synthesizer - Otis Stokes
 Backing vocals, bells, lead vocals - Tiemeyer McCain
 Backing vocals, electric piano (Fender Rhodes), lead vocals, piano (acoustic) - Mark Adam Wood, Jr.
 Backing vocals, lead vocals, vocals - Thomas Shelby
 Bass - Marvin Craig
 Clavinet, ensemble (string), keyboards, synthesizer - Norman Beavers
 Clavinet, guitar, synthesizer - Stephen Shockley
 Congas, percussion, synthesizer (bass), timbales - Fred Lewis
 Drums - Fred Alexander Jr.

External links
 Lakeside-Rough Riders  at Discogs

1979 albums
SOLAR Records albums
Albums produced by Leon Sylvers III
Lakeside (band) albums
Albums with cover art by Drew Struzan